James Walter Stephens (December 10, 1883 – January 2, 1965) was a Major League Baseball catcher who played six seasons with the St. Louis Browns of the American League from  to . A weak hitter, he had a career .220 batting average, and hit three home runs in his career, all during the 1909 season. Mostly a backup in his career, he was a starter in both the 1910 and 1912 seasons.

Notes

External links

1883 births
1965 deaths
St. Louis Browns players
Major League Baseball catchers
Dallas Giants players
Greenville Hunters players
Buffalo Bisons (minor league) players
Springfield Ponies players
Springfield Green Sox players
Baseball players from Ohio
People from Salineville, Ohio
People from Oxford, Alabama